Elachista arthadella is a moth of the family Elachistidae first described by Lauri Kaila in 1999. It is found in the United States, where it has been recorded from Oregon.

References

arthadella
Moths described in 1999
Moths of North America
Organisms named after Tolkien and his works